Thailand Tobacco Monopoly Football Club, commonly known as the TTM F.C., was a Thai football club originally based in Bangkok. The Club, founded in 1963, was one of the oldest clubs in Thailand. Their biggest achievement was winning the Thai Premier League title in 2005.

The club was subject to a number of renamings and moves from 2009: first to TTM-Samut Sakhon F.C, then to TTM F.C.-Phichit for the 2010 season, whereupon the team re-located to the Northern province. In 2012 the club once again relocated to Chiang Mai and would be known as TTM-Chiangmai F.C. In 2013 they moved to Lopburi, then in 2014 they returned to their original home of Bangkok. In 2015 they finished 19th and were relegated to the Regional League. The club was dissolved in 2015.

History

Thailand Tobacco Monopoly football club were formed in 1963 as the works teams of the company of the same name. They have been ever presents in the structure of Thai football since the game became professional in the 1996–97 season.

The early years

TTM as the team were more commonly known began life in the professional era in the 1996–97 Thailand Soccer League with 17 other teams. As this was the first season to use a traditional league format, it was determined that the bottom six teams would be relegated to form a new feeder league. TTM were one of the bottom 6 teams that would be relegated. They would not come back to the Thai Premier League until the 2001–02 Thai League season when they won their first silverware, the Thai Division 1 League.

On their return to the TPL, they comfortably found themselves as a mid table outfit, finishing in 8th position in their first three seasons. Although comfortably above the relegation zone, they were somewhat rather behind the leading pack.

Champions of Thailand 
In the 2004–05 Thai League TTM were to win their first and only league title. They won 9, drew 7 and lost 2 matches over the season.

ASEAN Club Championship Disaster

In July 2005, the team went quietly confident into the ASEAN Club Championship, a competition for league winners of the ASEAN region. TTM were drawn into Group B with the host club DPMM of Brunei, Tampines Rovers of Singapore and the Finance and Revenue team of Myanmar.

In the first group game, TTM let a 2-goal lead slip to the hosts DPMM played at the Sultan Hassal Bolkiah Stadium.  In the second group game they had to beat Tampines Rovers but they were strongly overcome by Tampines foreign contingent and lost 3:1. Therefore, they went into the last group game hoping that other results would go their way and that they in turn could also turn over a big goal difference. This was not to be the case as they once again lost and went out of the competition.

ACL Disqualification

TTM were expected to take part in the 2006 AFC Champions League but failed to register any paper work on time and were therefore disqualified. TTM were drawn in Group F with Koreans Ulsan Hyundai Horang-i, Tokyo Verdy of Japan and Arema of Indonesia.

New identity and relocations

In 2009 and with the shake up of Thai football in general, all company based teams had to become sports entities, thus forcing out the like of Bangkok Bank and Krung Thai Bank. TTM decided to re-locate from Bangkok and move to Samut Sakhon Province and renamed themselves TTM F.C. Samut Sakhon. They had in fact moved in the second half of the 2008 season but kept the same name TTM until 2009. Games would be played at the Samut Sakhon Stadium.

This name change and new identity would only last one season however, as again, in time for the 2010 season, they once again relocated to the province of Phichit Province and renamed TTM F.C. Phichit. This did not go down to well with some supporters of Thai football as they had moved from a province that previously didn't have a football club and moved to a province that already had a team, Phichit, who had worked hard to gather a supporter base. The plus side of TTM moving to Phichit is that from their previous home a new club was formed, Samut Sakhon.

After two season of mid-table anonymity in Phichit, the club took the gamble and tried their luck in the northern city of Chiang Mai. This move was to prove to be disastrous as TTM finished in bottom place and were relegated from the TPL in 2012. The club were shunned by the locals who preferred to stick by their regional league side Chiang Mai FC. In 2013 they moved to Lopburi, then in 2014 they returned to their original home of Bangkok, ground sharing with Customs United F.C.

Dissolution 
In 2015 they finished 19th in the second tier and were relegated to the Regional League and decided to dissolved the club.

Continental record

Invitational tournament record

Achievements
 Thai Premier League:
Winner: 2005

 Thailand Division 1 League:
Winner: 2000

 Kor Royal Cup:
Winner: 2006

Stadium and locations by season records

Season By Season record

P = Played
W = Games won
D = Games drawn
L = Games lost
F = Goals for
A = Goals against
Pts = Points
Pos = Final position

TPL = Thai Premier League

QR1 = First Qualifying Round
QR2 = Second Qualifying Round
QR3 = Third Qualifying Round
QR4 = Fourth Qualifying Round
RInt = Intermediate Round
R1 = Round 1
R2 = Round 2
R3 = Round 3

R4 = Round 4
R5 = Round 5
R6 = Round 6
GR = Group stage
QF = Quarter-finals
SF = Semi-finals
RU = Runners-up
S = Shared
W = Winners
DIS = Disqualified

Coaches
Coaches by Years (2000–present)

References

 http://tl.smmonline.net/news/143347.html

External links
 Official Facebook

Association football clubs established in 1963
Defunct football clubs in Thailand
Football clubs in Thailand
Sport in Bangkok
Sport in Chiang Mai province
TTM Phichit F.C.
1963 establishments in Thailand
Association football clubs disestablished in 2016
2016 disestablishments in Thailand
Works association football clubs in Thailand